Lophodoris is  a small genus of sea slugs, specifically dorid nudibranchs, marine gastropod molluscs in the family Goniodorididae.

Species 
This genus is little studied and there have been only a few observations.
 Lophodoris danielsseni (Friele & Hansen, 1876)  (originally described as Goniodoris danielsseni Friele & Hansen, 1876 ) : found in the Norwegian Sea and Southern Greenland.
 Lophodoris scala Marcus & Marcus, 1970 : found only in the neighborhood of São Paulo, Brazil where this small nudibranch (2 - 2.5 mm long) was collected from the intertidal burrow (15 – 30 cm deep) of an echiurid worm Lissomyema exilii, feeding on Entoprocts.

References 
 Odhner, N. H.  1922.  Norwegian opisthobranchiate Mollusca in the collections of the Zoological Museum of Kristiania; Nyt Magazin for Naturvidenskaberne 60:1-47.  [Meddelelser fra Det Zoologiske Museum, Kristiania, Nr. 1].
Franc, Andre.  1968.  Sous-classe des opisthobranches, pp. 608–893.  In: E. Fischer, Andre Franc,  Micheline Martoja, G. Termier, & H. Termier.  Traite de zoologie.  Anatomie, systematique, biologie.  Tome V, mollusques gasteropodes et scaphopodes (fascicule III), 1083 pp. 1 pl.
Marcus E, E Marcus. 1970. Opisthobranchs from Curaçao and faunistically related regions. Stud. Fauna Curaçao 33: 1- 129.
Just, H, & Edmunds, M. 1985. North Atlantic nudibranchs (Mollusca) seen by Henning Lemche, with additional species from the Mediterranean and the north east Pacific. Ophelia Suppl. 2: 1-170

External links 
Sea Slug Forum : Lophodoris danielsseni
Sea Slug Forum : Lophodoris scala

Goniodorididae